George Croghan (November 15, 1791 – January 8, 1849) was an American soldier who was a recipient of the Congressional Gold Medal.

Early life
Croghan was born at the Locust Grove farm in what is now Louisville, Kentucky. He was a son of Lucy ( Clark) Croghan (1765–1838) and William Croghan (1752–1822), a Catholic from Dublin, Ireland who he had served in the Revolutionary War at the battles of Brandywine and Monmouth. Among his maternal uncles were Capt. William Clark and Gen. George Rogers Clark. 

Croghan studied at the College of William and Mary, graduating in 1810.

Career
After he graduated from William and Mary, Croghan joined the U.S. Army. He fought at the Battle of Tippecanoe in 1811. He also served at Fort Meigs (modern Perrysburg, Ohio) with distinction. For his defense with a small garrison against a British attack during the Battle of Fort Stephenson, Ohio, in 1813 during the War of 1812, he was promoted to the rank of lieutenant colonel. He later led a troop that was defeated in the Battle of Mackinac Island.

Following the war, Croghan resigned from the army during a reduction in force and was appointed as a postmaster in New Orleans. In 1825, he became one of the two inspector generals in the army. During the Mexican–American War Croghan fought as a colonel at Monterrey.

Personal life
Croghan married Serena Eliza Livingston (1795–1884), a daughter of John R. Livingston and Margaret ( Sheafe) Livingston. Serena was a granddaughter of Robert Livingston (1718–1775) of Clermont Manor in New York. Together, they were the parents of:

 Mary Angelica Croghan (1819–1906), who married the Rev. Christopher Billop Wyatt, a grandson of Christopher Billop, in 1848.
 St. George Louis Livingston Croghan (1823–1861), who married Cornelia Adelaide Ridgely, daughter of Commodore Charles C. Ridgely (son of Gov. Charles C. Ridgely) and Cornelia Louisiana ( Livingston) Ridgely (daughter of Robert L. Livingston and granddaughter of Walter Livingston), in 1846.
 Serena Livingston Croghan (1833–1926), who married Augustus Frederick Rodgers.

Croghan died in New Orleans, Louisiana during the cholera epidemic of 1849, which had high mortality rates. He was buried at the site of Fort Stephenson, in what is now Fremont, Ohio.

Legacy and honors
Croghan's tomb and a soldiers' memorial to the war installed by the DAR in 1903 are both located on the library grounds near Croghan Street, which was renamed in his honor.

The village and town of Croghan, New York are also named after him.

References

1791 births
1849 deaths
Deaths from cholera
Military personnel from Louisville, Kentucky
American military personnel of the Mexican–American War
People from Kentucky in the War of 1812
Congressional Gold Medal recipients
College of William & Mary alumni
Infectious disease deaths in Ohio
Inspectors General of the United States Army
Burials in Ohio
American people of Irish descent
United States Army colonels